Mater Dei School is an independent Good Samaritan Education co-educational inclusive day school located in the outer south-western Macarthur region of Sydney, in the rural town of , in New South Wales, Australia. The school is part of a broader organisation of the same name, Mater Dei, and provides early intervention and early childhood education for babies and children with a developmental delay, and education and therapy services for children and young people with an intellectual disability.

The School is one of four programs part of Mater Dei: Mater Dei School, as the oldest and original educational offering, NextPath Continuous Learning, NextPath Assessment & Therapy and Mater Dei Early Childhood Education.

History
Mater Dei School was established in 1910 by the Sisters of the Good Samaritan, originally as an orphanage for orphans who lived in the inner city areas of Sydney. In 1957 the Bishop of Wollongong requested to establish a school for girls with intellectual disabilities and the Sisters accepted the request.

The school occupies the site of the historic mansion, Wivenhoe, designed by John Verge and built in 1837 for Charles Cowper and his wife, Eliza.

See also

List of Catholic schools in New South Wales
Roman Catholic Diocese of Wollongong
 Mater Dei (Organisation)

References

External links
 Mater Dei Homepage

Catholic primary schools in New South Wales
Catholic secondary schools in New South Wales
Educational institutions established in 1957
1910 establishments in Australia
1957 establishments in Australia
Special schools in Australia
Macarthur (New South Wales)